Critique of Hegel's Philosophy of Right is a manuscript written by the German political philosopher Karl Marx in 1843. Unpublished during his lifetime (except for the introduction, published in Deutsch–Französische Jahrbücher in 1844), it is a manuscript in which Marx comments on excerpts of Georg Wilhelm Friedrich Hegel's 1820 book Elements of the Philosophy of Right that deal with civil society and the state paragraph by paragraph. One of Marx's major criticisms of Hegel in the document is the fact that many of his dialectical arguments begin in abstraction.

This work contains the earliest formulation of Marx's theory of alienation, which is informed by the writings of Ludwig Feuerbach and Bruno Bauer. Narrative of the work develops around analysis of the relations between civil society and political society, including Marx's most famous commentaries on the function of religion in the introduction.

See also
 Opium of the people, a phrase coined in this work

References

Footnotes

Bibliography

External links
Zur Kritik der Hegelschen Rechtsphilosophie, German text
 Critique of Hegel’s Philosophy of Right

1843 non-fiction books
Books by Karl Marx
Books in political philosophy
Communist books
Works about Georg Wilhelm Friedrich Hegel
Modern philosophical literature